Shibkuh (also Romanized as Shībkūh) is a village in Dar Pahn Rural District, Senderk District, Minab County, Hormozgan Province, Iran. At the 2006 census, its population was 452, in 95 families.

References 

Populated places in Minab County